The middleweight class was a judo event held as part of the Judo at the 1964 Summer Olympics programme. The weight class was the second-lightest contested, and allowed judokas of up to eighty kilograms. The competition was held on Wednesday, October 21, 1964.

Twenty-five judokas from twenty nations competed.

Medalists

Results

Elimination round

The twenty-five competitors were divided into seven pools of three and one group of four. Each pool played a round-robin tournament, with the winner of the pool advancing to the quarterfinals.

Pool A

Pool B

Pool C

Pool D

Pool E

Pool F

Pool G

Pool H

Knockout rounds

The remaining eight judokas competed in a single elimination bracket. Losers in the quarterfinals were placed 5–8 while both losers in the semifinals won bronze medals.

Sources

References

External links
 

M80
Judo at the Summer Olympics Men's Middleweight